Anatoliy Maksymovych Zlenko (2 June 1938 – 1 March 2021) was a Ukrainian diplomat. He served as Ukraine's first Foreign Minister from 1990 to 1994 and again from 2000 to 2003. Zlenko was previously the Permanent Representative of Ukraine to the United Nations from 1994 to 1997.

Early life and career
Born 2 June 1938, in the village Stavyshche, Kyiv Oblast, Zlenko graduated from Kyiv mining college in 1959, and was made mining master of the "Maksymivka-Pologa" mine, located in Kadiivka (at the time the city was named Serho/Sergo). In 1967 Zlenko graduated from Kyiv University, and was subsequently made a diplomatic attache for the Ministry of Foreign Affairs of the USSR.

In 1973, Zlenko became a staff member of the Secretariat of UNESCO in Paris. He subsequently became the permanent representative of the USSR to UNESCO in October 1983. In April 1987, he became a Deputy of the Minister of Foreign Affairs of Ukraine and subsequently became the First Deputy for a year, between July 1989 and July 1990.

Minister of Foreign Affairs

In 1990, Zlenko became the first Foreign Minister of the newly independent Ukraine. He strongly promoted Ukraine's relations with Western Europe. In an interview in 1990, Zlenko said:

His first term concluded in September 1994, and he became the Permanent Representative of Ukraine to the United Nations until September 1997, subsequently serving as the Ukrainian Ambassador to France until 2000, in which capacity he returned to his former position as Ukrainian Representative to UNESCO (in November 1998 he also was appointed Ukrainian Ambassador to Portugal). He subsequently returned to his position as Minister of Foreign affairs, until retiring in 2003.

In 2010, Zlenko was appointed dean of the Faculty of International Relations of Kyiv Slavic University.

References

1938 births
2021 deaths
People from Stavyshche
Permanent Representatives of Ukraine to the United Nations
Soviet foreign ministers of Ukraine
Ambassador Extraordinary and Plenipotentiary (Soviet Union)
Foreign ministers of Ukraine
Ambassadors of Ukraine to France
Ambassadors of Ukraine to Portugal
Recipients of the Order of Prince Yaroslav the Wise, 2nd class
Recipients of the Order of Prince Yaroslav the Wise, 3rd class
Recipients of the Order of Prince Yaroslav the Wise, 4th class
Burials at Baikove Cemetery